2022 The Citadel Bulldogs baseball team represented The Citadel in the 2022 NCAA Division I baseball season.  The Bulldogs played their home games at Joseph P. Riley Jr. Park in Charleston, South Carolina. The team were coached by Tony Skole, in his 5th season at The Citadel.

The Citadel recorded an overall record of 26–31, and finished in 8th place with a record of 5–16 in the Southern Conference.

Previous season
The Bulldogs finished 12–39 overall, and 4–25 in the Southern Conference in 2021.  They were 8–7 on March 19 before struggling through the remainder of the season.

Personnel

Roster

Coaches

Schedule

References

Citadel
The Citadel Bulldogs baseball seasons
Citadel baseball